Give Me the Reason may refer to:

 Give Me the Reason (Luther Vandross album), 1986
 Give Me the Reason (Lady Saw album), 1996
 "Give Me the Reason" (song), a 1986 song by Luther Vandross

See also
 Give Me a Reason (disambiguation)
 "Just Give Me a Reason", a 2013 song by Pink featuring Nate Ruess, fun.'s lead singer
 "Give Me One Reason", a 1996 song by Tracy Chapman